The Krigsvold Nunataks are a small cluster of isolated nunataks located directly at the head of Strauss Glacier, in Marie Byrd Land, Antarctica. They were mapped by the United States Geological Survey from surveys and U.S. Navy air photos, 1959–65, and were named by the Advisory Committee on Antarctic Names after Sergeant Alvin I. Krigsvold, U.S. Army, a member of the Army–Navy Trail Party that blazed a trail from Little America V to establish Byrd Station in 1956.

References

Nunataks of Marie Byrd Land